Kleptoplasty or kleptoplastidy is a symbiotic phenomenon whereby plastids, notably chloroplasts from algae, are sequestered by host organisms. The word is derived from Kleptes (κλέπτης) which is Greek for thief. The alga is eaten normally and partially digested, leaving the plastid intact. The plastids are maintained within the host, temporarily continuing photosynthesis and benefiting the predator. The term was coined in 1990 to describe chloroplast symbiosis.

Ciliates 

Mesodinium rubrum is a ciliate that steals chloroplasts from the cryptomonad Geminigera cryophila. M. rubrum participates in additional endosymbiosis by transferring its plastids to its predators, the dinoflagellate planktons belonging to the genus Dinophysis.

Karyoklepty is a related process in which the nucleus of the prey cell is kept by the predator as well. This was first described in 2007 in M. rubrum.

Dinoflagellates 
The stability of transient plastids varies considerably across plastid-retaining species. In the dinoflagellates Gymnodinium spp. and Pfisteria piscicida, kleptoplastids are photosynthetically active for only a few days, while kleptoplastids in Dinophysis spp. can be stable for 2 months. In other dinoflagellates, kleptoplasty has been hypothesized to represent either a mechanism permitting functional flexibility, or perhaps an early evolutionary stage in the permanent acquisition of chloroplasts.

Sacoglossan sea slugs 
 

Some of the only known animals that practice kleptoplasty are sea slugs in the clade Sacoglossa. Several species of Sacoglossan sea slugs capture intact, functional chloroplasts from algal food sources, retaining them within specialized cells lining the mollusc's digestive diverticula. The longest known kleptoplastic association, which can last up to ten months, is found in Elysia chlorotica, which acquires chloroplasts by eating the alga Vaucheria litorea, storing the chloroplasts in the cells that line its gut. Juvenile sea slugs establish the kleptoplastic endosymbiosis when feeding on algal cells, sucking out the cell contents, and discarding everything except the chloroplasts. The chloroplasts are phagocytosed by digestive cells, filling extensively branched digestive tubules, providing their host with the products of photosynthesis. It is not resolved, however, whether the stolen plastids actively secrete photosynthate or whether the slugs profit indirectly from slowly degrading kleptoplasts.

Due to this unusual ability, the sacoglossans are sometimes referred to as "solar-powered sea slugs," though the actual benefit from photosynthesis on the survival of some of the species that have been analyzed seems to be marginal at best. In fact, some species may even die in the presence of the carbon dioxide-fixing kleptoplasts as a result of elevated levels of reactive oxygen species.

Changes in temperature have been shown to negatively affect kleptoplastic abilities in sacoglossans. Rates of photosynthetic efficiency as well as kleptoplast abundance have been shown to decrease in correlation to a decrease in temperature. The patterns and rate of these changes, however, varies between different species of sea slug.

Nudibranchs
Some species of nudibranchs such as Pteraeolidia ianthina sequester whole living symbiotic zooxanthellae within their digestive diverticula, and thus are also "solar-powered".

Foraminifera 
Some species of the foraminiferan genera Bulimina, Elphidium, Haynesina, Nonion, Nonionella, Nonionellina, Reophax, and Stainforthia have been shown to sequester diatom chloroplasts.

Rhabdocoel flatworms 
Two species from the group of marine flatworms known as the rhabdocoels, Baicalellia solaris and Pogaina paranygulgus, have been found to constitute another type of animal that displays kleptoplasty. The group was previously classified as having algal endosymbionts, though it was already discovered that the endosymbionts did not contain nuclei.

While consuming diatoms, B. solaris and P. paranygulus, in a process not yet discovered, extract plastids from their prey, incorporating them subepidermally, while separating and digesting the frustule and remainder of the diatom. In B. solaris the extracted plastids, or kleptoplasts, continue to exhibit functional photosynthesis for a short period of roughly 7 days. As the two groups are not sister taxa, and the trait is not shared among groups more closely related, there is evidence that kleptoplasty evolved independently within the two taxa.

See also
Horizontal gene transfer
Kleptoprotein

References

External links

Algae
Ecology terminology
Endosymbiotic events